Israel Vázquez Castañeda (born December 25, 1977) is a Mexican former professional boxer who competed from 1995 to 2010. He is a three-time super bantamweight world champion, having held the IBF title from 2004 to 2005; and the WBC, The Ring titles twice from 2005 to 2008. Vázquez is best known for his series of four fights against fellow Mexican Rafael Márquez.

Professional career
In 1995, Vázquez made his professional debut in the bantamweight division at the age of 17. He stopped his first nine opponents before suffering a knock out loss himself. Fighting mainly in the US and at junior featherweight, he beat 11 opponents, most notably Óscar Larios (20-0), before losing a split decision to Marcos Licona.

Vázquez scored 12 consecutive victories, and in 2002, he met Larios in a rematch for the interim WBC Super Bantamweight Title . This time, he was outboxed and stopped in the 12th round.

Vázquez rebounded with a stoppage of ex-world title holder Jorge Eliecer Julio and won the vacant IBF Junior Featherweight title against southpaw Jose Luis Valbuena in 2004.

In the first defence of his IBF title he knocked out undefeated Armenian Artyom Simonyan in the 5th round. In 2005, Vázquez opted to fight WBC champion Óscar Larios for a third time with the WBC belt on the line instead of defending his IBF belt. He won the rubber match by technical knockout in the third round — after the fight was stopped due to a large cut over Larios's left eye, thus becoming The Ring and Lineal Junior Featherweight champion and ending Lario's streak of nine consecutive title fight victories.

On June 10, 2006, Vázquez defeated former champion Ivan Hernández (23-1-1). Vázquez defeated the WBO Bantamweight champion Jhonny González on September 16, 2006 in a bout where Vázquez was knocked down twice before coming back to win the match by 10th round TKO.

Vázquez vs. Márquez

In his next bout, on March 3, 2007, Vázquez lost his title to the number one ranked Bantamweight Rafael Márquez. Although Vazquez scored a knockdown in the third round, he retired on his stool at the end of round seven because of breathing problems arising from a broken nose. In a rematch on August 4, 2007, Vásquez regained his title. Despite suffering cuts over both eyes, he scored a knockout against Márquez in the sixth round in a fight that was named Ring Magazine's fight of the year for 2007. The third round of this fight was also named Ring Magazine round of the year.

He fought Marquez for the third time on March 1, 2008, rising from a fourth round knockdown to prevail by split decision in another great fight. Márquez was docked one point for low blows in round ten and received an eight count in the final seconds of round twelve. The fight was named 2008's Fight of the Year by The Ring Magazine and the fourth round was named Ring Magazine round of the year. The Vázquez vs Márquez trilogy has been widely heralded as one of the best boxing trilogies in recent years.

On December 18, 2008, Vázquez was stripped of his WBC Super Bantamweight Championship after not defending the title for a certain period of time due to a detached retina he had suffered during his third fight with Márquez. Japanese fighter Toshiaki Nishioka's WBC Interim title was promoted to actual championship status after his victory over Genaro Garcia. After undergoing three surgeries, Vázquez was medically cleared to resume training on May 15, 2009.

Vázquez fought Marquez for a fourth time on May 22, 2010. The bout took place in the Featherweight division and was held at the Staples Center in Los Angeles, California, United States. The match was appropriately titled "Once and Four All" and carried live by Showtime. Marquez scored a third round TKO victory over Vázquez to even their series at two wins each.
Afterwards, Marquez stated: "The fifth one could be a possibility if the fans vote for it. That is what I live for. Israel Vázquez is a great fighter." However, it was felt by some observers that the much faded Vázquez should retire. Frank Espinoza, Vázquez's longtime handler, stated that his "career is over". The fourth installment of the Vázquez-Marquez rivalry was the last fight of Vázquez' career.

Professional boxing record

See also
List of super bantamweight boxing champions
List of WBC world champions
List of IBF world champions
List of Mexican boxing world champions

References

External links

Israel Vázquez profile at Cyber Boxing Zone

1977 births
International Boxing Federation champions
Living people
Boxers from Mexico City
Super-bantamweight boxers
World Boxing Council champions
Mexican male boxers
The Ring (magazine) champions
Featherweight boxers